Broad Street–Water Street Historic District is a national historic district located at Lyons in Wayne County, New York. It includes 25 contributing buildings. The district consists of a "T" shaped commercial area that encompasses a section of the Erie Canal and includes structures dating from the 1830s to 1890s.

It was listed on the National Register of Historic Places in 1973.

References

Commercial buildings on the National Register of Historic Places in New York (state)
Historic districts on the National Register of Historic Places in New York (state)
Historic districts in Wayne County, New York
National Register of Historic Places in Wayne County, New York